The Kansas Policy Institute (KPI) is a free market American think tank based in Wichita, Kansas. A member of the State Policy Network, it primarily focuses on state and local policy issues in Kansas, including education, budget and spending, health care,  and property taxes. The president of the KPI is Dave Trabert and the chairman of the board is George Pearson.

History
The group's stated mission is to "advocate for free market solutions to public policy issues and the protection of personal freedom for all Kansans."

Founded in 1996 as the Kansas Public Policy Institute, the think tank changed its name to the Flint Hills Center for Public Policy, then back to Kansas Policy Institute in 2009. It was founded by a group of Kansans who supported the Cato Institute and wanted to apply that model to Kansas state government. KPI hosts events across the state; publishes studies geared toward policy makers, the general public, and community leaders; and uses traditional and social media to discuss state and local government through the free market perspective. In addition to its policy studies, KPI maintains a site titled KansasOpenGov.

Issues

Education funding
In 2010, KPI raised awareness about the State Unencumbered Fund balances, concluding that state school districts had over $699 million in carryover operating funds. The institute concluded that schools were not spending all of the money they were being given and were instead putting money in the bank. This claim drew both positive and negative attention from the media and school boards and the issue became a topic of conversation in the K-12 finance debate. SB 111 passed the Kansas Legislature in the 2011 session, allowing Kansas school districts to more easily access that money to offset declines in base per-pupil aid from the state.

Awards
The institute's president, George Pearson, received the John J. Ingalls Spirit of Freedom Award from the Atlas Network in 2016.

References

External links 
 

Think tanks based in the United States
Political and economic think tanks in the United States
Organizations established in 1996
Organizations based in Wichita, Kansas
Conservative organizations in the United States
Libertarian think tanks
Politics of Kansas